The Fairweather–Trevitt House is a Late Victorian 2-story house located in Republic, Washington.  It was built in 1902 for George W. Fairweather, an early figure in the mines of the Republic Mining District.  Little has changed on the exterior of the house since its construction. Over the years a new concrete foundation and a roofed back porch were added.

See also
List of Registered Historic Places in Washington

References

External links
Fairweather–Trevitt House entry

History of Washington (state)
Houses on the National Register of Historic Places in Washington (state)
Houses in Ferry County, Washington
National Register of Historic Places in Ferry County, Washington